"Rest on Us" is a song performed by American contemporary worship groups Maverick City Music and Upperroom featuring Brandon Lake and Eniola Abioye. It was released by Tribl Records as the opening track on their collaborative extended play, Move Your Heart, on January 29, 2021. The song had been originally recorded and released by Harvest and Jon Thurlow on their collaborative album, There in the Middle (2020). The song was written by Brandon Lake, Elyssa Smith, Harvest Bashta, Jonathan Jay, Rebekah White, and Tony Brown. Jonathan Jay, Tony Brown, and Oscar Gamboa produced the song.

"Rest on Us" debuted at No. 36 on the US Hot Christian Songs chart, and No. 12 on the Hot Gospel Songs chart.

Composition

Commercial performance
"Rest on Us" debuted at No. 39 on the US Hot Christian Songs, and No. 7 on the Hot Gospel Songs charts dated February 13, 2021, "Rest on Us" went on to peak at No. 36 on the Hot Christian Songs chart and spent a total of twenty-four non-consecutive weeks, and at No. 12 on the Hot Gospel Songs chart spending a total of twenty-six non-consecutive weeks.

Music video
Tribl released the official music video of "Rest on Us" featuring Brandon Lake and Eniola Abioye leading the song at Upperroom, Dallas, Texas, through their YouTube channel on February 5, 2021.

Charts

Weekly charts

Year-end charts

Elle Limebear version

Elle Limebear released a studio-recorded version of "Rest on Us" as a single on June 17, 2022.

Composition

Commercial performance
Limebear's version of "Rest on Us" debuted at No. 38 on the US Christian Airplay chart dated July 23, 2022.

Limebear's version made its debut at No. 48 on the US Hot Christian Songs chart dated August 27, 2022.

Music videos
On June 17, 2022, the official music video for "Rest on Us" by Elle Limebear was published on her YouTube channel.

Track listing

Charts

Release history

Other versions
 Upperroom released their rendition of the song with Elyssa Smith on their live album, Land of the Living (2020).
 Tribl and Maverick City Music released a version of the song featuring Mariah Adigun and Jekalyn Carr on their collaborative live album, Tribl Nights Anthologies (2022).

References

External links
 

2021 songs
Maverick City Music songs
Brandon Lake songs
Songs written by Brandon Lake